Crova is a comune (municipality) in the Province of Vercelli in the Italian region Piedmont, located about  northeast of Turin and about  west of Vercelli.

The municipality of Crova contains the frazioni (subdivisions, mainly villages and hamlets) Viancino and it borders the following municipalities: Lignana, Ronsecco, Salasco, San Germano Vercellese, Santhià, and Tronzano Vercellese.

Demographic evolution

References

Cities and towns in Piedmont